Khalil Morsy (21 September 1946 – 5 August 2014) was an Egyptian actor.

He died of a heart attack at the age of 68. Morsi had been brought to the Salam Hospital in the city
of Cairo, Egypt in East Cairo near
Nasr City 
 Egyptian actor Khalil Morsi dead at 68</ref>

References

1946 births
2014 deaths
Egyptian male film actors
Egyptian male stage actors

Egyptian Muslims